Randi Goteni (born 5 July 1995) is a Congolese professional footballer who plays as a midfielder for  club Paris 13 Atletico and the Congo national team.

Club career
In the summer of 2017, Goteni joined Championnat National side Béziers on loan from Troyes for the 2017–18 season. He joined Dunkerque on loan in December 2018. In June 2019, he signed a one-year contract with Dunkerque.

On 17 June 2021, Goteni joined Laval. On 24 June 2022, he signed for Paris 13 Atletico.

International career
Goteni was born in the Republic of the Congo, but raised in France. He represented the France U16 in a friendly in 2011. Goteni debuted for the Congo U20s for a friendly in 2015. He made his Congo national team debut on 10 October 2019 in a friendly against Thailand.

Honours 
Laval

 Championnat National: 2021–22

References

External links
 
 

1995 births
Living people
Sportspeople from Brazzaville
Association football midfielders
Republic of the Congo footballers
Republic of the Congo international footballers
French footballers
France youth international footballers
Republic of the Congo emigrants to France
Ligue 2 players
Championnat National players
Dijon FCO players
ES Troyes AC players
AS Béziers (2007) players
USL Dunkerque players
Stade Lavallois players
Paris 13 Atletico players